Duško Stajić  (born 11 July 1982) is a Bosnian retired professional footballer.

Club career
Stajić started his career with FK Rudar Ugljevik moving on to FK Proleter Zrenjanin in the Second League of FR Yugoslavia early in his career, and later played with Publikum Celje in the Slovenian PrvaLiga during the second half of 2004–05 and entire 2005-06 seasons. He played for FK Sarajevo in the Bosnian Premier League during the 2007-08 season. In December 2009, he was linked with a move to SPL sides St Mirren, Falkirk and Hamilton. In February 2010, Stajić left FK Modriča, signing for Rot Weiss Ahlen. On 28 April 2010, Rot-Weiss Ahlen announced they would not sign Stajić permanently following his loan, and that he would return to FK Modriča. In summer 2010, since his club was relegated, he moved to FK Borac Banja Luka in the Premier League of Bosnia and Herzegovina. After a short spell in FK Sloboda Užice, he signed for NK Čelik Zenica. At the second half of the 2013–14 season he had a spell in Greek second tier side Iraklis Psachna, but in summer 2014 he was back in Bosnia this time to join newly promoted FK Mladost Velika Obarska. However in the following winter break he left Mladost and joined FK Jedinstvo Brodac playing in the Second League of the Republika Srpska where his goalscoring skills will return by making 9 goals in 13 appearances.

In January 2019 he was snapped up by lower league side Mladost Popovo Polje. He joined Slobodan Starčević' coaching staff at Radnik Bijeljina in November 2019.

International career
He was part of the Bosnia and Herzegovina national under-21 football team.

References

External links
 
 

1982 births
Living people
People from Ugljevik
Association football forwards
Bosnia and Herzegovina footballers
Bosnia and Herzegovina under-21 international footballers
FK Rudar Ugljevik players
FK Proleter Zrenjanin players
1. FC Slovácko players
NK Celje players
CSM Ceahlăul Piatra Neamț players
FK Radnik Bijeljina players
FK Sarajevo players
FK Modriča players
Rot Weiss Ahlen players
FK Borac Banja Luka players
FK Sloboda Užice players
NK Čelik Zenica players
Iraklis Psachna F.C. players
FK Mladost Velika Obarska players
Second League of Serbia and Montenegro players
Czech First League players
Slovenian PrvaLiga players
Liga I players
Premier League of Bosnia and Herzegovina players
2. Bundesliga players
Serbian SuperLiga players
Football League (Greece) players
Bosnia and Herzegovina expatriate footballers
Expatriate footballers in Serbia and Montenegro
Bosnia and Herzegovina expatriate sportspeople in Serbia and Montenegro
Expatriate footballers in the Czech Republic
Bosnia and Herzegovina expatriate sportspeople in the Czech Republic
Expatriate footballers in Slovenia
Bosnia and Herzegovina expatriate sportspeople in Slovenia
Expatriate footballers in Romania
Bosnia and Herzegovina expatriate sportspeople in Romania
Expatriate footballers in Germany
Bosnia and Herzegovina expatriate sportspeople in Germany
Expatriate footballers in Serbia
Bosnia and Herzegovina expatriate sportspeople in Serbia
Expatriate footballers in Greece
Bosnia and Herzegovina expatriate sportspeople in Greece